Harwich Center is a census-designated place (CDP) in the town of Harwich in Barnstable County, Massachusetts, United States. The population was 1,798 at the 2010 census.

Geography
Harwich Center comprises the central settlement in the town of Harwich, located at  (41.688302, -70.072015). It is bordered by the CDPs of Northwest Harwich to the north and west, East Harwich to the north and east, and Harwich Port to the south. The village center is at the intersection of Massachusetts Route 39 (Main Street) and Massachusetts Route 124 (Pleasant Lake Avenue).

Demographics

As of the census of 2000, there were 1,832 people, 810 households, and 514 families residing in the CDP. The population density was 314.4/km2 (813.1/mi2). There were 1,102 housing units at an average density of 189.1/km2 (489.1/mi2). The racial makeup of the CDP was 92.69% White, 0.82% African American, 0.27% Native American, 0.27% Asian, 3.93% from other races, and 2.02% from two or more races. Hispanic or Latino of any race were 0.66% of the population.

There were 810 households, out of which 22.8% had children under the age of 18 living with them, 51.0% were married couples living together, 9.9% had a female householder with no husband present, and 36.5% were non-families. 31.1% of all households were made up of individuals, and 17.2% had someone living alone who was 65 years of age or older. The average household size was 2.22 and the average family size was 2.79.

In the CDP, the population was spread out, with 19.5% under the age of 18, 5.4% from 18 to 24, 22.8% from 25 to 44, 26.0% from 45 to 64, and 26.3% who were 65 years of age or older. The median age was 46 years. For every 100 females, there were 83.8 males. For every 100 females age 18 and over, there were 76.9 males.

The median income for a household in the CDP was $41,230, and the median income for a family was $53,077. Males had a median income of $35,950 versus $25,690 for females. The per capita income for the CDP was $23,702. About 1.9% of families and 3.9% of the population were below the poverty line, including 2.2% of those under age 18 and 4.0% of those age 65 or over.

References

Harwich, Massachusetts
Census-designated places in Barnstable County, Massachusetts
Census-designated places in Massachusetts